Spodnja Ponkvica is a settlement in the hills above Šentvid in the Municipality of Šmarje pri Jelšah in eastern Slovenia. The area is part of the traditional region of Styria. The municipality is now included in the Savinja Statistical Region.

References

External links
Spodnja Ponkvica at Geopedia

Populated places in the Municipality of Šmarje pri Jelšah